The 7th Battalion (1st British Columbia), CEF was a battalion of the Canadian Expeditionary Force that saw service in the First World War.

History 
The 7th Battalion (1st British Columbia), CEF was created on 2 September 1914 with recruits from British Columbia. The battalion set off for England on board the Virginian berthed in Quebec. They arrived in England on 14 October 1914 with a strength of 49 officers and 1083 men. The battalion became part of the 1st Canadian Division, 2nd Canadian Infantry Brigade where it saw action along the Western Front. The battalion returned to Canada on 18 April 1919, was demobilized on 25 April 1919, and disbanded soon after.

Perpetuations 
The 7th Battalion (1st British Columbia), CEF is perpetuated by The British Columbia Regiment (Duke of Connaught's Own).

Battle honours 

 Ypres 1915, 17
 Gravenstafel
 St. Julien
 Festubert, 1915
 Mount Sorrel
 Somme, 1916
 Thiepval
 Ancre Heights
 Arras 1917, '18
 Vimy, 1917
 Arleux
 Hill 70
 Passchendaele
 Amiens
 Scarpe, 1918
 Drocourt-Quéant
 Hindenburg Line
 Canal du Nord
 Pursuit to Mons
 France and Flanders, 1915-18

Notable people
 Victor Odlum

See also 

 List of infantry battalions in the Canadian Expeditionary Force

References

Further reading 
 

007
Military units and formations of British Columbia
British Columbia Regiment (Duke of Connaught's Own)